Lane Gibson is an American musician and recording engineer from Metuchen, New Jersey. His musical career spans over 40 years and since the 1990s has also led to a career in sound engineering and mastering. From his recording studio in Charlotte, Vermont, Gibson has had the chance to work with many world-renowned artists and bands.

Career
Like many young Americans at the time, Gibson was inspired by The Beatles after their appearance on The Ed Sullivan Show in 1963. He had already been learning to play the guitar, but now began to think of music as a dream career rather than a hobby. After completing high school, he attended the University of Denver in Denver, Colorado. During his time in Colorado, he and some cousins formed the Davis Brothers Garage Band. The band played covers of popular songs from the time including material from Elton John, Steely Dan, Emerson, Lake and Palmer, and Carlos Santana. As the band grew and matured they also began writing and performing their own songs as they toured, at first mostly in the Rocky Mountain West, later throughout New England.

The peak of Gibson's career with the Davis Brothers Garage Band came when the band signed a recording contract with the English Charisma Records label. They recorded their hit single, "Lookin' For The Money" with the B Side "If I Need Anybody". The song met with some commercial success, but the band ended up doing far more live performing than studio recording, and effectively broke up in 1982, although they have played reunion shows including in the mid-2000s.

Recording and Mastering
As early as 1980, while playing with the Davis Brothers Garage Band, Gibson was also developing a second career in the recording studio. Both laying down keyboard tracks and singing vocals, he noticed that he had an ear for helping musicians create clean, balanced recordings. In 1993, he was working on backup vocals for a studio session in Vermont when he met Charles Eller, of Charles Eller Studios. The two hit it off, and Eller asked Gibson to join him as a sound engineer. In Eller's words, the two have "been going strong ever since and make up an extremely strong team".

As a sound engineer, Gibson has worked with artists from across the country, including The Vermont Symphony Orchestra, The Vermont Jazz Ensemble, Trey Anastasio, Jon Fishman, Grace Potter and the Nocturnals, Kento Masuda, and Elizabeth Von Trapp. In 2009, he took control of the Carpenter Farm Studio in Charlotte, Vermont and officially founded Lane Gibson Recording and Mastering. The Carpenter Farm building is a classic Vermont farmhouse with a custom-designed recording studio attached to it that has been described in the API industry blog as "made up of spacious yet intimate rooms to enable smooth workflow". Gibson believes the natural beauty of the state as well as the lack of background interference contribute to his clients' success.

Discography

Selected recording, mixing and mastering credits

References

External links 
 Charles Eller Studios
 Lane Gibson Recording Studio

Living people
Year of birth missing (living people)
American keyboardists
Guitarists from Vermont
20th-century American guitarists